This is a list of instruments used in general in laboratories, including:
Biochemistry
Microbiology
Pharmacology


Instrument list

Image gallery

References 

Medical equipment
Biochemistry methods
Laboratory equipment
Microbiology equipment
Clinical pathology